The TechProAviation Merlin HV 100 is a Czech amateur-built aircraft, designed and produced by TechProAviation of Olomouc. The aircraft is supplied as a kit for amateur construction.

Design and development
The Merlin 100 features a cantilever high-wing, a single-seat enclosed cockpit accessed via a single door on the fuselage righthand side, fixed tricycle landing gear with wheel pants and a single engine in tractor configuration.

The aircraft is made from matched-hole drilled sheet aluminum. The standard engine used is the  Verner JCV 360 twin cylinder four-stroke powerplant. Alternative engines include the  HKS 700E four-stroke,  Hirth F-23 and  Rotax 582 two-stroke powerplants. The aircraft will be marketed as a kit only.

By mid-2011 only the prototype had flown, logging 100 hours of testing, These tests led to modifications; by November 2012 the prototype had gained a fin fillet and the mainwheel legs were slightly forward raked.

Operational history
By 2013 ten Merlins had been built. Flyaway prices, without tax, are engine dependent; the cheapest is the Verner-engined variant at €15,500 in 2015.

Variants
These are in production in late 2015: 
Merlin 100 UL
Version for the Fédération Aéronautique Internationale microlight class, specification below. A tailwheel version was flown in April 2012 and is available.
Merlin 100 ML
It first flew in late March 2014.
Merlin Mikro
Version with conventional landing gear for the European 120 kg class. Equipped with a Thor 200 powerplant.
Rotax
An amphibious floatplane version is planned.

Specifications (Merlin 100 UL)

References

External links
Official website
Official video

Homebuilt aircraft
Single-engined tractor aircraft